Brooks P. Coleman, Jr. (born October 11, 1939) is an American politician. He is a member of the Georgia House of Representatives from the 97th District, serving since 1992. He is a member of the Republican party.

References

Living people
Republican Party members of the Georgia House of Representatives
1939 births
Politicians from Atlanta
21st-century American politicians